The IV Velká Cena Masarykova (1933 Masaryk Grand Prix, V Masarykův okruh) was a 750 kg Formula race held on 17 September 1933 at the Masaryk Circuit.

Classification

References

Grand Prix race reports
Masaryk
Masaryk